Susan E. Brown, Ph.D., is a medical anthropologist and certified nutritionist, and two-time Fulbright scholar, who uses holistic and non-pharmacological interventions in the treatment of osteoporosis. She is the author of several books on the topic of natural bone health, including Better Bones, Better Body: Beyond Estrogen and Calcium (McGraw Hill 2000).

References

Year of birth missing (living people)
Living people
Medical anthropologists
American women nutritionists
American nutritionists